Christine Demeter (1940 – July 18, 1973) was murdered in the garage of her home in Mississauga, Ontario, Canada, at the age of 33. The case attracted much attention in Canada because Demeter, a model, was young and beautiful, and her murder had been mysterious.

The case was investigated by Detective William Teggart (who would later rise to police chief) of the Peel Regional Police. Demeter's husband, Peter Demeter, was subsequently convicted of hiring a killer to murder her to cash in on a million-dollar insurance policy. He was sentenced to life imprisonment. As of May 31, 2010, Peter Demeter (now 77 years old) is still in prison in Ontario.

George Jonas and his then-wife Barbara Amiel, published a book about the case, By Persons Unknown: The Strange Death of Christine Demeter (1976).

The Demeter case served as the basis for the fictional 1978 film I Miss You, Hugs and Kisses, directed by Murray Markowitz. The victim is renamed Magdalene Kruschen and is played by German actress Elke Sommer.

References 

 "Wife-killer loses DNA legal battle", The Whig-Standard, 30 May 2006.

1940 births
1973 deaths
Canadian murder victims
Female murder victims
People murdered in Ontario